Tunxis Community College is a public community college in Farmington, Connecticut. Opened in 1969, it is named after the Tunxis Native American Tribe and is part of the Connecticut Community Colleges system.

Admission
Tunxis has an open admissions policy. Tuition costs depend on in-state or out-of-state status.

Academics
Tunxis awards Associate in Arts and Associate in Science degrees and also offers Certificate programs. Students may pursue a "Transfer Ticket" associate degree program and upon completion transfer to a Connecticut State University as a junior to complete their bachelor's degree.

Accreditation

Tunxis Community College is approved by the Connecticut Board of Governors for Higher Education and accredited by the New England Commission of Higher Education (NECHE).  The most recent comprehensive review by NECHE was in 2011 and the next comprehensive review is scheduled for Fall 2021.

Campus
Originally operating in a former shopping mall, a large expansion to the campus was completed in 2008. The expansion included a new 37,074 square foot library building with a cafe, and a 57,800 square foot classroom technology building.  In 2013 a further expansion to the classroom building was completed that added another 56,000 square feet of space for classrooms and labs.

References

External links
 Official website

Community colleges in Connecticut
Farmington, Connecticut
Educational institutions established in 1969
Universities and colleges in Hartford County, Connecticut
1969 establishments in Connecticut